Immediately after the liberation after World War II, the Bijzonder Gerechtshof (Dutch language, "Special Court of Justice") was a court that was established in the Netherlands to try defendants accused of committing high treason, treason and war crimes. There were 14,000 such cases, and 145 cases led to sentence of death. Only 42 of those cases actually led to an execution by a firing squad. This led to the last instances of Capital punishment in the Netherlands.

A few known people that were sentenced to death and actually executed were Max Blokzijl, Anton Mussert and the only woman executed Ans van Dijk.

Netherlands
Military history of the Netherlands
20th century in the Netherlands
1940s in the Netherlands
Netherlands in World War II